Luan Leite da Silva (born 31 May 1996) is a Brazilian professional footballer who plays as a centre-back for Bulgarian club Spartak Varna, on loan from Lokomotiv Plovdiv.

Career
On 10 July 2021, Luan joined Superleague Greece side Ionikos on a free transfer.

On 5 July 2022 he signed a contract with the Bulgarian First League team Lokomotiv Plovdiv. On 7 February 2023 Luan was send on loan to Spartak Varna until end of season. He completed his debut on 11 February, scoring a goal against Ludogorets Razgrad in a league match lost by Spartak by 1:2.

Career statistics

References

External links

 

1996 births
Living people
People from Campo Grande
Sportspeople from Mato Grosso do Sul
Brazilian footballers
FC Liefering players
FC Red Bull Salzburg players
SK Sturm Graz players
SKN St. Pölten players
Ionikos F.C. players
PFC Lokomotiv Plovdiv players
PFC Spartak Varna players
2. Liga (Austria) players
Austrian Football Bundesliga players
Super League Greece players
Brazilian expatriate footballers
Brazilian expatriate sportspeople in Austria
Expatriate footballers in Austria
Brazilian expatriate sportspeople in Greece
Expatriate footballers in Greece
Association football defenders